Mike Higgins is a Jersey politician who was first sworn in as a Deputy on 8 December 2008.  He was re-elected as Deputy in the 2011 elections.

Background
Higgins was educated at the University of London where he received an economics degree.

He was a commissioned officer in the Royal Air Force and Royal Air Force Volunteer Reserve (Training Branch) from 1971 to 1983 and, in 1983, was awarded the Cadet Forces Medal for services to the Air Training Corps.

He has been the organiser of the Jersey International Air Display, a long-running annual event in Jersey, since 1997.

References

External links
Record of service to the States

Deputies of Jersey
Living people
Alumni of the University of London
Year of birth missing (living people)